Edex can refer to several institutions:
EDEX, education and career guidance project.
Edex Live, a newspaper
Prostaglandin E1, medication